This topic lists the Racquetball events for 2019.

2019 World Racquetball Competitions
 April 12 – 20: XXXII Pan American Championships in  Barranquilla
 September 5 – 7: 2019 European Racquetball Championships in  Hamburg
 November 9 – 16: XXI Junior World Championships in  San José
 November 29 & 30: Asia Open Championships in TBD place

2018–19 International Racquetball Tour
 September 13 – 16, 2018: MWRA Season Opener-IRT Pro/Am in  Laurel
 Singles:  Rocky Carson defeated  Samuel Murray, 15-7, 15-12.
 October 3 – 7, 2018: US Open Racquetball Championships in  Minneapolis
 Singles:  Kane Waselenchuk defeated  Daniel de la Rosa, 15-11, 15-6.
 Doubles:  Álvaro Beltrán &  Daniel de la Rosa defeated  Ben Croft &  Kane Waselenchuk, 15-11, 15-6.
 November 29 – December 2, 2018: Pelham Memorial Tournament of Champions in  Portland
 Singles:  Kane Waselenchuk defeated  Álvaro Beltrán, 15-6, 15-12.
 January 3 – 6: 2019 California Open in  Canoga Park
 Singles:  Kane Waselenchuk defeated  Daniel de la Rosa, 15-8, 15-10.
 Doubles:  Álvaro Beltrán &  Daniel de la Rosa defeated  Alejandro Landa &  Samuel Murray, 15-11, 15-8.
 January 17 – 20: Lewis Drug Pro/Am in  Sioux Falls
 Singles:  Kane Waselenchuk defeated  Daniel de la Rosa, 15-4, 15-2.
 Doubles:  Rodrigo Montoya &  Andree Parrilla defeated  Alejandro Landa &  Samuel Murray, 15-11, 15-11.
 March 14 – 17: 34th Annual Shamrock Shootout and IRT Pro Stop in  Lombard
 Singles:  Kane Waselenchuk defeated  Rocky Carson, 15-10, 15-10.
 Doubles:  Ben Croft &  Kane Waselenchuk defeated  Álvaro Beltrán &  Daniel de la Rosa, 11-15, 15-9, 11-5.
 March 27 – 31: Bolivia American Iris Open in  Cochabamba

2018–19 Ladies Professional Racquetball Tour
 August 24 – 26, 2018: Paola Longoria Experience in  San Luis Potosí City
 Singles:  Paola Longoria defeated  Samantha Salas, 11-7, 11-1, 11-3.
 Doubles:  Samantha Salas &  Paola Longoria defeated  Alexandra Herrera &  Monserrat Mejia, 15-10, 15-9.
 September 26 – 30, 2018: World 3-WallBall Championships in  Las Vegas
 Singles Round Robin: 1st.  Janel Tisinger, 2nd.  Rhonda Rajsich, 3rd.  María José Vargas, 4th.  Natalia Mendez
 Doubles Round Robin: 1st.  Michelle Herbert &  Rhonda Rajsich, 2nd.  Carla Muñoz &  Michelle Key, 3rd.  Jackie Paraiso &  Janel Tisinger, 4th.  Natalia Mendez &  María José Vargas
 Mixed Doubles:  Rhonda Rajsich &  Rick Soda Man Koll defeated  Michelle Key &  Daniel de la Rosa, 12-12, 15-12, 11-8.
 October 3 – 7, 2018: US Open Racquetball Championships in  Minneapolis
 Singles:  Paola Longoria defeated  Samantha Salas, 11-9, 11-2, 11-5.
 Doubles:  Samantha Salas &  Paola Longoria defeated  Montserrat Mejia &  Alexandra Herrera, 15-11, 15-14.
 October 26 – 28, 2018: 2018 Boston Open in  Peabody
 Singles:  Paola Longoria defeated  Samantha Salas, 11-8, 11-6, 11-6.
 Doubles:  Samantha Salas &  Paola Longoria defeated  María Reneé Rodríguez &  Alexandra Herrera, 15-7, 15-2.
 November 16 – 18, 2018: Glass Court Turkey Shoot in  Lombard
 Singles:  Paola Longoria defeated  Samantha Salas, 10-12, 11-3, 11-4, 11-7.
 Doubles:  Samantha Salas &  Paola Longoria defeated  Alexandra Herrera &  Carla Muñoz, 15-2, 15-9.
 December 14 – 16, 2018: 27th Annual LPRT Christmas Classic Pro-AM in  Laurel
 Singles:  Paola Longoria defeated  Alexandra Herrera, 11-8, 11-4, 11-7.
 Doubles:  Paola Longoria &  Kelani Bailey Lawrence defeated  Alexandra Herrera &  Frédérique Lambert, 15-7, 15-10.
 January 25 – 27: 2019 Sweet Caroline Open LPRT in  Greenville
 Singles:  Paola Longoria defeated  Samantha Salas, 11-1, 11-2, 11-6.
 Doubles:  Paola Longoria &  Samantha Salas defeated  María José Vargas &  Natalia Méndez, 15-5, 15-6.
 March 27 – 31: Bolivia American Iris Open in  Cochabamba

2018–19 European Racquetball Tour
 October 13 & 14, 2018: 2018 Hamburg Open in  Hamburg
 Men's Singles:  Oliver Bertels defeated  Marcel Czempisz, 15-11, 15-13.
 Women's Singles: Round Robin: 1.  Yvonne Mesecke, 2.  Maaike Weerdesteijn, 3.  Renate Hartmann
 Men's Doubles:  Agustín Rodríguez Inclán &  Jose Felix defeated  Marcel Czempisz &  Oliver Bertels, 15-6, 9-15, 11-4.
 October 20 & 21: 2018 Kilkenny Irish Open in  Kilkenny
 Men's Singles:  Mark Murphy defeated  Noel O'Callaghan, 2–1.
 Women's Singles:  Aisling Hickey defeated  Donna Ryder, 2–1.
 Men's Doubles:  Mark Murphy &  Ben Carey defeated  Padraic Ryder &  Ken Cottrell, 2–0.
 March 15 – 17: Dutch Open 2019 in  The Hague
 Men's Singles:  Marcel Czempisz 
 Men's Doubles:  Marcel Czempisz &  Arne Schmitz defeated  Pascal Matla &  Edwin Schipper, 11–7, in the Tie-Break.
 Women's Singles:  Maaike Weerdesteijn defeated  Renate Lietz, 2–0.

References

External links
 International Racquetball Federation

 
Racquetball by year
racquetball
2019 sport-related lists